Ultrasound biomicroscopy (UBM) is a type of ultrasound eye exam that makes a more detailed image than regular ultrasound.

Operation
High-energy sound waves are bounced off the inside of the eye and the echo patterns are shown on the screen of an ultrasound machine. This makes a picture called a sonogram.

Ocular use
It is useful in glaucoma, cysts and neoplasms of the eye, as well as the evaluation of trauma and foreign bodies of the eye.

References

External links

 Ultrasound biomicroscopy entry in the public domain NCI Dictionary of Cancer Terms

Medical ultrasonography